Charaña Airport ,  is an extremely high elevation airstrip serving Charaña, a town in the altiplano of the La Paz Department of Bolivia.

The Charana non-directional beacon (Ident: CHA) is located on the field.

See also

Transport in Bolivia
List of airports in Bolivia

References

External links 
OpenStreetMap - Charaña
OurAirports - Charaña
SkyVector - Charaña
Fallingrain - Charaña Airport

Airports in La Paz Department (Bolivia)